Earl Rogers (November 18, 1869 – February 22, 1922) was an American trial lawyer and professor, who later became the inspiration for Perry Mason.

Life
Earl Rogers was born in Perry, New York on November 18, 1869, the son of Methodist minister Lowell L. Rogers and Ada (Andrus) Rogers. The Reverend Rogers moved the Rogers family to California in 1874. Rogers attended Ashland Academy in Ashland, Oregon and St. Helena Academy in St. Helena, California. He then studied at Syracuse University, but left to return to California after his father went bankrupt.

Rogers worked as a newspaper reporter, then studied law under former U.S. senator Stephen M. White and Judge William P. Gardiner. Rogers was admitted to the bar in 1897, and began to practice in Los Angeles. Among the prospective attorneys who studied law under Rogers was Buron Fitts, who later became a Los Angeles County district attorney.

As a defense counsel, Rogers handled 77 murder trials and lost only three . He astonished medical experts on the witness stand with his technical questions . His expertise was so complete that he became a professor of medical jurisprudence and insanity in the College of Physicians and Surgeons as well as a professor at the University of Southern California Law School. In "The Case of the Grinning Skull," Rogers introduced the victim's skull to prove what appeared to be a fracture caused by a violent blow from a blunt instrument, in fact, was the result of the autopsy surgeon's carelessness.  The jury returned a not guilty verdict. 

Ten years after his death, impressed with accounts of Rogers' cases, attorney and author Erle Stanley Gardner reincarnated Rogers as the character Perry Mason. Earl Rogers's life is recounted by his daughter Adela Rogers St. Johns, who was his assistant for most of his legal career, in her book Final Verdict (Doubleday, 1962), which was the basis of the television film Final Verdict, that was produced by Warner Bros.

Notable cases

William Alford, 1899
Rogers defended William Alford from a murder charge by entering the victim's intestines into evidence. An expert witness testified that the path of the bullet confirmed Alford's story .

Charles F. Mootry, 1899
Rogers defended Charles F. Mootry from a charge of murdering his wife by appealing to the jurors' own feelings about their wives. After the trial, when Mootry tried to congratulate Rogers, he turned away from Mootry and said, "Get away from me, you slimy pimp; you're as guilty as hell and you know it."

The Catalina Island murder 1902
Rogers is also remembered for the defense in the Catalina Island murder case. In the early morning of August 13, 1902 at the Metropole Hotel, a gambler, William A. Yeagar, better known as "the Louisville Sport," was murdered during a card game. Alfred Boyd was one of three men in the room playing poker. Harry Johnson, who was at the table, ran from the room, yelling "He shot him, he shot him!" and handed Boyd's gun to bartender Jim Davis, who thought that there was no question that Boyd was the killer. Boyd was charged with the murder, but Rogers won an acquittal..

Griffith J. Griffith, 1903
Colonel Griffith J. Griffith, the namesake of Griffith Park, was tried for the attempted murder of his wife. He was convicted of the lesser charge of assault with a deadly weapon and served two years in prison.

Morrison Buck, 1906
In 1906, Rogers made one of his rare appearances for the prosecution and used his medical expertise to send Morris Buck to the gallows for the murder of Chloe Canfield, wife of Charles A. Canfield (1848-1913).

Patrick Calhoun 1909
Patrick Calhoun, president of the United Railroad Company, was charged with bribing the San Francisco Board of Supervisors in exchange for granting the overhead trolley franchise to his company in the wake of the 1906 San Francisco earthquake.  Rogers defended Calhoun, but during his trials and all the related trials of United Railroad Company's general counsel, Tiery Ford, Rogers did not call a single witness nor introduce any evidence, arguing that the prosecution simply hadn't made a case against the defendants.  On June 20, 1909, the Calhoun jury was deadlocked, with the final jury vote at ten for acquittal and two for conviction.  He was not retried.

Clarence Darrow, 1912-1913
Perhaps the most famous lawyer-client disagreements recorded in legal history were those which developed between Clarence Darrow, indicted for attempted jury bribery in Los Angeles in 1912, and Earl Rogers. The case arose out of Darrow's defense of the McNamara brothers, labor leaders who were indicted in the 1910 dynamiting of the Los Angeles Times building, in which 21 Times non-union employees were killed.

The McNamara brothers were indicted, and Clarence Darrow was brought in to defend them. The case gripped the attention of the entire nation. Before the McNamara brothers could plead guilty, however, Darrow himself was charged by the Los Angeles district attorney with an attempt to bribe a juror. Darrow then hired  Rogers as his chief counsel.

When the case went to trial, however, Darrow frequently disagreed with his attorney over how the case should be tried. According to the account of Adela Rogers St. Johns, much of her father's energy during the trial was given over to trying to persuade Darrow and his wife to accept his position on how to try the case.

Rogers was successful in getting Darrow, the great champion of organized labor, to refrain from making an argument essentially condoning the dynamiting of the Times building and the killing of 21 people. Rogers and Darrow both made closing arguments. Rogers' short summary of the evidence was business-like and to the point, emphasizing his own theory of the case that Darrow was too smart to have been involved in a bribery scheme and that he would not in any event have knowingly run across the street at the scene of the bribery and thus drawn attention to his presence at the scene.

Darrow was acquitted, but he was later indicted for allegedly attempting to bribe another juror in the McNamara case. Rogers began the second case as lead counsel but was soon forced to withdraw for health reasons. The second bribery trial ended in a hung jury, with several jurors holding out for a conviction.

It was not until many months later that the second indictment was finally dismissed, based on Darrow's agreement never to practice law in California again. The most difficult advocating that Earl Rogers faced in the Darrow case was to persuade Darrow not to continually hurt his own case with unappealing – if not suicidal – arguments."

The actor Robert Vaughn played Rogers in the episode, "Defendant: Clarence Darrow" (January 13, 1963), of the CBS anthology series, GE True, hosted by Jack Webb. In the story line, Darrow, played by Tol Avery, and Rogers argue passionately over legal procedures.

Jess Willard 1913
Rogers defended boxer Jess Willard on charges of second-degree murder stemming from the death of his opponent, John "Bull" Young, from a blow to the head in the ninth round of a boxing match on August 22, 1913.  On January 13, 1914, a jury found Willard not guilty.  Willard later went on to become heavyweight champion of the world.

Charles E. Sebastian, 1916
Rogers successfully defended Los Angeles Police Chief Charles E. Sebastian, who later became mayor, against a charge of contributing to the delinquency of a minor. While running for the mayor's office Sebastian was charged with many crimes but was later acquitted of all of them. However, he left City Hall on September 2, 1916, after adverse publicity concerning his personal life arose from the publication of several letters of a damaging nature, and Earl Rogers ran the mayor's office until  Frederick T. Woodman was appointed acting mayor on September 5, 1916.

References

St. Johns, Adela Rogers, Final Verdict, (Doubleday, 1962)

External links

 

1869 births
1922 deaths
California lawyers
Criminal defense lawyers
Trial lawyers
Lawyers from Buffalo, New York
Burials at Evergreen Cemetery, Los Angeles
19th-century American lawyers
People from Perry, New York
Southern Oregon University alumni
Lawyers from Los Angeles